CCDI may refer to:

Camargo Corrêa Desenvolvimento Imobiliário, Brazilian real estate company
Canadian Centre for Diversity and Inclusion, Canadian nonprofit organization
Central Commission for Discipline Inspection of the Chinese Communist Party
China Construction Design International